National Highway 161BB, commonly called NH 161BB is a national highway in India. It is a spur road of National Highway 61 through NH 161.  NH-161BB traverses the state of Telangana in India.

Route 
Madnoor, Sonala, Thadi Hipperga, Limboor, Sirpur, Pothangal, Kotagiri, Rudrur, Bodhan, Basar, Bhainsa.

Junctions  

  Terminal near Madnoor.
  Terminal near Bodhan.

See also 
 List of National Highways in India
 List of National Highways in India by state

References 
4.https://www.thehindu.com/news/national/telangana/nh-161-road-widening-works-pick-pace/article34029080.ece/amp/

External links 

 NH 161BB on OpenStreetMap

National highways in India
National Highways in Telangana